Sergey Findziukevich is a Belarusian sprint canoer who has competed since the late 2000s. He won a silver medal in the K-4 500 m at the 2007 ICF Canoe Sprint World Championships in Duisburg.

References

Belarusian male canoeists
Living people
Year of birth missing (living people)
ICF Canoe Sprint World Championships medalists in kayak